Parazilia is a monotypic genus of Congolese long-jawed orb-weavers containing the single species, Parazilia strandi. It was first described by R. de Lessert in 1938 from a female specimen found in the Congo.

See also
 List of Tetragnathidae species

References

Monotypic Araneomorphae genera
Spiders of Africa
Tetragnathidae